USS Vicksburg (CG-69) is a  guided missile cruiser serving in the United States Navy. She is named for the Siege of Vicksburg fought during the American Civil War.

Vicksburg was built by Ingalls Shipbuilding, at Pascagoula, Mississippi and commissioned on 14 November 1992.

With her guided missiles and rapid-fire cannons, Vicksburg is capable of facing threats in the air, on the sea, ashore, and underneath the sea. She is also capable of carrying two SH-60 Sea Hawk Light Airborne Multi-Purpose System (LAMPS III) helicopters.

Vicksburg was originally named Port Royal, but the name was changed before the keel was laid. She was the only Ticonderoga-class vessel to have a formal name change until .  was later named Port Royal.

The previous  was a  light cruiser during and after World War II. Vicksburgs crest has two stars on the streamer in the eagle's beak representing the two battle stars awarded to her predecessor.

History

1990s 
Vicksburg was built by Ingalls Shipbuilding, at Pascagoula, Mississippi. Her keel was laid down on 30 May 1990, and she was launched on 7 September 1991. Vicksburg was sponsored by Tricia Lott, wife of United States Senator, Trent Lott. On 12 October 1991, Mrs. Lott christened CG-69 as Vicksburg. She was commissioned on 14 November 1992.

On her maiden cruise in 1994, Vicksburg was assigned to the  battle group, which was stationed off the coast of Montenegro. Vicksburg participated in Operation Deny Flight and Operation Provide Promise, serving as an airspace command and control platform. In May 1994, Vicksburg participated in NATO's "Dynamic Impact 94" exercise in the western Mediterranean, and in August 1994 Vicksburg joined Operation Able Vigil, helping to intercept Cuban migrants crossing the Florida Straits.

Vicksburg returned from a 6 month deployment in March 1996. During the deployment, Vicksburg participated in Operation Southern Watch in the Persian Gulf. Vicksburg also performed Maritime Interception Operations to enforce UN sanctions that prohibited exports from Iraq. Vicksburg conducted over 85 boardings. At that time, the primary contraband was dates carried by  dhows. Vicksburg visited Italy, Spain, and the United Arab Emirates during the deployment.

In 1997, Vicksburg deployed to the Mediterranean Sea with the  carrier battle group (CVBG).

In 1998, Vicksburg and  had problems integrating AEGIS Baseline 6 and Cooperative Engagement Capability (CEC), rendering the ships unavailable for service. The  CVBG deployed in September 1999 without Vicksburg and Hué City.

2000s 
In 2001, Vicksburg and the rest of the  CVBG extensively tested the CEC system. Following the September 11 attacks, the battle group supported Operation Noble Eagle.

In February 2002, Vicksburg deployed with the  battlegroup, initially to the Mediterranean Sea. In March 2002, Vicksburg was part of John F. Kennedy CVBG as it relieved the  CVBG, in support of Operation Enduring Freedom. On 16 June 2002, off the coast of Oman, Vicksburg launched an SH-60B from HSL-42, Det 7, to assist Stolt Spray. The tanker was standing by to assist the foundering motor vessel al Murthada, but monsoon conditions prevented its assistance. Vicksburg’s helicopter transferred al Murthada’s distressed mariners, who had been adrift for eight days, to Stolt Spray for further transportation.

In March 2003, she was assigned to Naval Surface Group Two.

In December 2004, Vicksburg and the  battlegroup returned from a six month deployment to the Middle East.

Vicksburg departed on a surge deployment to the middle east on 26 January 2006. In February, Vicksburg became the first US Navy ship to refuel from a new Defense Fuel Supply Point in Djibouti. Vicksburg returned in June 2006.

On 16 February 2007, Vicksburg was awarded the 2006 Battle "E" award.

25 January 2008, Vicksburg returned to Mayport following a 6 month deployment to the Persian Gulf.

In February 2009, deployed to the Persian Gulf as part of the  Strike Group.

2010s 
Vicksburg deployed with the  CVBG in March 2012 on the carrier's final deployment. Vicksburg visited Piraeus, Greece in late March 2012. Vicksburg conducted operations with FS Cassard (D 614) April 16-24, 2012. Vicksburg visited Bahrain at the end of May and again in August. Vicksburg visited Lisbon, Portugal on October 17, 2012. Vicksburg returned to Mayport in November 2012.

The US Navy was planning to retire Vicksburg along with eight other Ticonderoga class cruisers in fiscal year 2013 in line with US Defense Department budget reductions. The ship was scheduled to be decommissioned on 31 March 2013.
Language inserted into the FY13 House of Representatives Defense Bill retained Vicksburg and two other of her sister ships that were slated for decommissioning. Retaining the ships in the active fleet was not supported by the United States Secretary of Defense, but the outcome was determined by the final FY13 Defense Bill negotiated with the United States Senate. Vicksburg and two other Ticonderoga-class cruisers were retained under the National Defense Authorization Act for Fiscal Year 2013.

In 2014, the cruiser participated in Joint Warrior 14-2, a United Kingdom-led multinational exercise in British coastal waters. The training was designed to provide allied forces a multiwarfare environment to prepare for global operations. On 4 December 2014, Vicksburg departed Naval Station Mayport to relieve  as the Standing NATO Maritime Group 2 flagship and to support theater security cooperation efforts in Europe. The ship returned to Mayport on 11 July 2015.

On 1 July 2016, Vicksburg was transferred from Carrier Strike Group Twelve to the Naval Sea Systems Command (NAVSEA) and entered the Navy's Cruiser Modernization program. The ship's homeport was changed to Norfolk and the crew was reduced from 350 to less than 50.

2020s 

In January 2020, Vicksburg was sent to BAE Systems for an $175 million, 18-month Service Life Extension Program (SLEP). In May 2022, Vicksburg was reported to be 85% completed with its modernization and was expected to be complete by summer 2023. According to Rep. Kay Granger (R-Texas), "Since 2020, the Navy has awarded nearly $500 million in contracts to upgrade the cruiser."

The Navy requested to decommission Vicksburg in its FY23 and FY24 budgets.

Awards

In popular culture
 Vicksburg is featured prominently in the 2012 naval thriller, Fire of the Raging Dragon, by Don Brown.

See also
 Aegis Combat System

Notes

External links
 Official website
 Official website early 2000s 
 USS Vicksburg webpage at NavySite
 Cooperative Engagement Capability (CEC)
 Globalsecurity.org – CG 69 Vicksburg

 

Ticonderoga-class cruisers
Ships built in Pascagoula, Mississippi
1991 ships
Cruisers of the United States